Dee is the nickname of:

Entertainers

In music 

 Dee Alexander, American jazz singer
 Dee Barton (1937–2001), American jazz trombonist, big band drummer and composer
 Dee Harvey (1965–2012), American R&B singer
 Dee C Lee (born 1961), British soul, R&B, and pop singer
 Dewi Lestari (born 1976), Indonesian writer, singer, and songwriter
 Dee Palmer (born 1937), English musician and former member of Jethro Tull
 Demetra Plakas (born 1960), American musician, drummer in the rock band L7
 Dee Roscioli (born 1977), American singer and actress who performed in productions of the musical, Wicked
 Dee Snider (born 1955), American singer-songwriter, screenwriter, radio personality, and actor best known as the lead singer of the heavy metal band Twisted Sister
 Dee Ho (born 1990), Hong Kong singer-songwriter

In film and television 
 Dee Bradley Baker (born 1962), American voice actor
 Dee Smart (born 1966), Australian actress known as Lucinda Croft in  the soap opera Home and Away
 Dee Wallace (born 1948), American actress known for her role as Mary in the 1982 film E.T. the Extra-Terrestrial
 Dee Rees (born 1977), American screenwriter and director

Athletes

In baseball 

 Dee Brown (baseball) (born 1978), American former professional baseball outfielder
 Dee Cousineau (1898–1951), American professional baseball player
 Dee Gordon (born 1988), American professional baseball center fielder
 Dee Miles (1909–1976), American professional baseball outfielder
 Dee Phillips (1919–2004), American professional baseball player, manager, and scout
 Dee Walsh (1890–1971), American Major League Baseball outfielder and shortstop

In basketball 

 Dee Ayuba (1986–2018), British–Nigerian basketball forward
 Dee Bost (born 1989), American-born naturalized Bulgarian professional basketball player
 Dee Brown (basketball) (born 1968), American retired professional basketball player
 Dee Brown (basketball) (born 1984), American professional basketball player and college coach
 Dee Davis (born 1984), American retired professional basketball player
 Dee Rowe (1929–2021), American basketball coach

In football 

 Dee Brown (American football) (born 1978), American football running back
 Dee Dowis (1968–2016), American quarterback for the United States Air Force Academy
 Dee Hardison (1956–2018), American National Football League defensive lineman
 Dee Hart (born 1992), American football running back
 Dee Martin (born 1949), American football defensive back
 Dee McCann (born 1983), American former professional gridiron football cornerback
 Dee Milliner (born 1991), American football cornerback
 Dee Virgin (born 1993), American football cornerback
 Dee Webb (born 1984), American football defensive back

Politicians 

 Dee Brown (politician) (born 1948), American politician from Montana
 Dee Doocey (born 1948), British Liberal Democrat politician and former Chair of the London Assembly
 Dee Forbes (born 1967), Irish Director-General of RTÉ
 Walter Dee Huddleston (1926–2018), American Democrat from Kentucky who represented the state in the United States Senate
 Dee Caperton Kessel (1943–2000), Former First Lady of West Virginia and Miss West Virginia (1964)
 Dee Margetts (born 1955), a former Australian politician
 Dee Margo (born 1952), American businessman and 54th mayor of El Paso, Texas
 Dee Morikawa, American politician and member of the Hawaii House of Representatives
 Dee Richard (born 1955), American Independent members of the Louisiana House of Representatives
 Dee Ryall (born 1967), Australian politician and member of the Victorian Legislative Assembly

People in other fields 

 Dee Boeckmann (1906–1989), American middle-distance runner
 Dee Brasseur (born 1953), Canadian retired military officer (Major)
 Dee Brown (writer) (1908–2002), American novelist, historian, and librarian
 Dee Caffari (born 1973), British sailor and first woman to single-handedly sail non-stop around the world against the prevailing winds and currents
 Dee Haslam (born 1954), American businesswoman, and CEO and executive producer of RIVR Media
 Dee Mangin, a New Zealand primary care academic
 Dee Mosbacher  (born 1949), American filmmaker, lesbian feminist activist, and practicing psychiatrist
 Dee O'Hara (born 1935), NASA's first aerospace nurse
 Dee Wells (1925–2003), American journalist, novelist, and broadcaster

Fictional characters 

 Dee Bliss, fictional character from the Australian soap opera Neighbours
 Deandra Reynolds, fictional character on the FX television series It's Always Sunny in Philadelphia

See also 

Nicknames
Lists of people by nickname